Gregory J. Stoltenburg (born 1964) is an American lawyer, veteran, and current presiding judge of the Third Judicial Circuit in South Dakota.

Early life and education
Born in Clear Lake, South Dakota, Stoltenburg earned a bachelor's degree in Agricultural Business and Commercial Economics from South Dakota State University in May 1986. In 1981, he joined the South Dakota Army National Guard (SDARNG) and served on active duty in Saudi Arabia during Operation Desert Storm in 1991.  He also volunteered for service following Hurricane Katrina in 2005. Stoltenburg attended the University of South Dakota School of Law, graduating with Sterling honors in 1995.

Career  
Following graduation, he worked as a judicial law clerk for Justice John K. Konenkamp of the South Dakota Supreme Court before returning to his hometown of Clear Lake in 1996 to practice law.  Stoltenburg continued his military service in the U.S. Army JAG Corps in 1996 and subsequently attended The JAG School at the University of Virginia. 

In addition to his private practice, Stoltenburg was Deuel County Deputy States Attorney from 1996 to 2000 and as the Deuel County States Attorney from 2000 to 2012. Stoltenburg eventually rose to become the Deputy Staff Judge Advocate for the South Dakota Army National Guard. He retired from the JAG Corps with the rank of Lieutenant Colonel in 2017.

State judicial service
He was appointed by Governor Dennis Daugaard in October 2012 to replace David Gienapp. Stoltenburg took office after Gienapp's retirement on January 1, 2013. He was re-elected in 2014 for a term that expires in 2022. In April 2015, Stoltenburg was appointed presiding judge of the Third Circuit by Chief Justice David Gilbertson.

After being appointed to the circuit bench, Stoltenburg has sat on the South Dakota Supreme Court bench lieu Justice John K. Konenkamp, whom he had clerked for, on a number of cases.

Personal life
Stoltenburg is a member of St. Mary’s Catholic Church in Clear Lake and is involved in many community organizations and events.  He and his wife, Lynn, have five children.

External links
 http://judgepedia.org/Greg_Stoltenburg

References 

1962 births
Living people
South Dakota state court judges
People from Deuel County, South Dakota
South Dakota State University alumni
University of South Dakota School of Law alumni
The Judge Advocate General's Legal Center and School alumni